Malcomson is a surname. Notable people with the surname include:

Alexander Y. Malcomson, coal dealer from Detroit who financed Henry Ford
Paula Malcomson (born 1970), Scottish-Irish actress
Ruth Malcomson (1906–1988), Miss America in 1924
Malcomson family

See also
Malcomson and Higginbotham, an architectural firm based in Detroit
Malcolmson
Malcolm (disambiguation)